Károly Hauszler (born 19 March 1952) is a Hungarian former water polo player who competed in the 1980 Summer Olympics.

See also
 Hungary men's Olympic water polo team records and statistics
 List of Olympic medalists in water polo (men)
 List of men's Olympic water polo tournament goalkeepers

References

External links
 

1952 births
Living people
Hungarian male water polo players
Water polo goalkeepers
Olympic water polo players of Hungary
Water polo players at the 1980 Summer Olympics
Olympic bronze medalists for Hungary
Olympic medalists in water polo
Medalists at the 1980 Summer Olympics
20th-century Hungarian people